Khalid Amayreh (b. 1957 Hebron) is a Palestinian journalist based in Dura, near Hebron.

Conflict with the Palestinian Authority
Amayreh is barred from leaving the West Bank. For many years Amayreh was confined to his home village of Dura near Hebron by the Israeli military occupation authorities. The Palestinian Human Rights Monitoring Group issued reports and press releases relevant to the harassment of Amayreh by both Israel and Palestinian authorities.

On 22 January 2009, Amayreh was arrested by the police forces of the Palestinian Authority (PA).  He was questioned and imprisoned in a blacked-out room for two days. The PA stated the reason for his arrest was not his reporting about financial corruption in the PA but suspicion of affiliation with Hamas. Others state the reason for his arrest was his statements about the collaborationist nature of the PA during the 2008–2009 Gaza War.  He was released due to a mass outcry and protest at his arrest.

He was once again harassed on several occasions by the PA beginning in January 2012.  The purpose of the continuous harassment is not totally clear, but it might have something to do with the PA's declared hostility against Hamas and any of its sympathizers.

Views and opinions
In 2008, Amayreh stated that "It is well known that Israel, through the numerous Zionist lobbies and pressure groups, more or less controls America's politics, media and financial institutions…. But America doesn't lack the brain power to know the facts and find out the truth about the umbilical connection between the Israeli factor and the ravaging financial crisis now facing the US… I am afraid there will be more bad news in this regard if America doesn't reclaim its liberty from the Zionist Robber [sic] Barons who have come to tightly control the American financial establishment." This article was picked up by many other blogs, Web sites, and listserves.
In 2010, Amayreh described Helen Thomas and Fidel Castro as the "elderly targets" of "Zionist supremacists from Tel Aviv to Los Angeles", supporting calls for Jewish invaders to return to Poland and their "native homelands". In March 2011, he wrote that Israelis are "pathological liars and colonialist invaders  from Eastern Europe" and that Jerusalem has been "violated and raped by Zionist Jews for many years". He described Zionism as a "genocidal, racist, rapacious, covetous, and of course utterly mendacious… a malignant cancer" and claimed that Israel wishes to erect a "Hebrew empire" encompassing  "Palestine, Jordan, Lebanon, Syria, Iraq, Kuwait, northern Saudi Arabia, northern Egypt and the islands of Crete and Cyprus".
Amayreh has been accused of distorting the historical record regarding the nature of Arab nationalism.

Books 
Journalism and Mass communication, Theory and Practice (Arabic, 1996)
Refutation of Western Myths and Misconceptions about Islam and the Palestinian question (Arabic, 1988)
Living Under the Israeli Occupation, (Arabic, 2007)
MY Story with the Shiites: Major Contradictions In The Shiite Imami Religion (Arabic 2016, English 2017)

References

External links
www.xpis.ps Amayreh's webpage
List of articles at EsinIslam
List of  articles in English

1957 births
Living people
Anti-Zionism
Palestinian journalists